Meichtry is a surname. Notable people with the surname include:

Dominik Meichtry (born 1984), Swiss competitive swimmer
Jean Meichtry, Swiss slalom canoeist